Ricky Thomas Kehoe (born July 15, 1951) is a Canadian former professional ice hockey player and coach, most notably for the Pittsburgh Penguins of the National Hockey League.

Playing career 
Kehoe played junior hockey in the Ontario Hockey Association with the London Knights and the Hamilton Red Wings.  He was drafted in the second round (22nd overall) by the Toronto Maple Leafs in the 1971 NHL Entry Draft.

He played in 32 games with the Tulsa Oilers of the Central Hockey League in 1971 before being promoted to the Maple Leafs midway through the 1972 season.  He led the Leafs in goal scoring during the 1973 season with 33 goals.

Kehoe was traded to the Pittsburgh Penguins in 1974 and spent the remainder of his playing days with the Penguins.  A notably clean player—he recorded 120 penalty minutes in a 14-season career—he won the Lady Byng Trophy in 1981, during which he scored a career best 55 goals.  He retired after the 1985 season as the Penguins' career scoring leader, and is fifth today behind Mario Lemieux, Jaromír Jágr,  Sidney Crosby and Evgeni Malkin.

In his playing career, he played in 906 NHL games, scoring 371 goals and 396 assists for 767 points, and accrued 120 penalty minutes. In 39 playoff games, he scored 4 goals and 17 assists for 21 points with 4 penalty minutes.

Awards and achievements 
 Won the Lady Byng Trophy in 1980–1981.
 Played in the NHL All-Star Game in 1981 and 1983.
 Member of the Trib Total Media Penguins All-Time Team and the Pittsburgh Penguins Hall of Fame
 Pictured up in the Ring of Honor that formerly circled in the Pittsburgh Civic Arena

Career statistics

Coaching career 
Kehoe became Director of Pro Scouting for the Penguins in 1985 and was named an assistant coach in 1986.  Kehoe's name was engraved on the Stanley Cup with Pittsburgh in 1991 and 1992. He remained in the Penguins organization as a scout or assistant coach until 2002.

Four games into the 2001–02 season, Kehoe took over for former Czech Olympic coach Ivan Hlinka as head coach of the Penguins.  Kehoe served as head coach of the Penguins from 2002 to 2003, amassing a 55–81–14 record. Kehoe was replaced by Ed Olczyk after the 2002–03 season.  His final stint as a coach in the organization was as interim coach for the minor-league Wilkes-Barre/Scranton Penguins when Michel Therrien was called up to Pittsburgh as head coach; the Baby Pens had a 2–1 record in the three games Kehoe was behind the bench.

On September 18, 2006, he was named to the professional scouting staff for the New York Rangers.

Kehoe was inducted into the Pittsburgh Penguins Hall of Fame in 1992 and the Western Pennsylvania Sports Hall of Fame in 1995. He currently resides in Canonsburg, Pennsylvania.

Coaching record

References

External links 

1951 births
Living people
Canadian ice hockey coaches
Canadian ice hockey forwards
Hamilton Red Wings (OHA) players
Ice hockey people from Ontario
Sportspeople from Windsor, Ontario
Lady Byng Memorial Trophy winners
London Knights players
National Hockey League All-Stars
New York Rangers scouts
Pittsburgh Penguins coaches
Pittsburgh Penguins players
Pittsburgh Penguins scouts
Stanley Cup champions
Toronto Maple Leafs draft picks
Toronto Maple Leafs players
Tulsa Oilers (1964–1984) players
Wilkes-Barre/Scranton Penguins head coaches
Canadian expatriate ice hockey players in the United States